Napa Valley College, formerly Napa Junior College and Napa Community College, is a public community college in Napa, California. The tree-lined main campus is on  overlooking the Napa River and includes a performing arts center, a child development center, a business development center, a Visual Arts Center including a Gallery and Ceramics Studio, and the Napa Valley Vintners Teaching Winery. An Upper Valley Campus in St. Helena includes the Napa Valley Cooking School, training aspiring chefs. In 2014–2015, the total enrollment was about 8,559.

History
The college was founded in 1942 after voters in Napa County passed a bond initiative in 1941.  From 1942 to 1964, it operated as a four-year junior college, incorporating grades 11 through 14. The original campus was located on the same property as Napa High School.  The college was later moved to its current location in 1965 when a campus was established on surplus state property which originally was part of land belonging to Napa State Hospital.

See also
 Pacific Union College

References

External links

 
California Community Colleges
Universities and colleges in Napa County, California
Napa Valley
Napa, California
St. Helena, California
Educational institutions established in 1942
1942 establishments in California